Sybra subgeminata is a species of beetle in the family Cerambycidae. It was described by Breuning in 1939.

References

subgeminata
Beetles described in 1939